Turks in Greece may refer to:

 Turks of Crete
 Turks of the Dodecanese
 Turks of Western Thrace

See also 
 Muslim minority of Greece

 
Ethnic groups in Greece
Greece
Middle Eastern diaspora in Greece